Igor Alekseyevich Leshchuk (born 20 February 1996) is a Russian football player who plays as goalkeeper for FC Dynamo Moscow.

Club career
He made his debut in the Russian Professional Football League for FC Dynamo-2 Moscow on 28 August 2016 in a game against FSK Dolgoprudny.

He made his Russian Premier League debut for FC Dynamo Moscow on 10 August 2019, when he had to come in for injured Anton Shunin in a game against FC Zenit Saint Petersburg. He started the next 6 games as Shunin was recovering (including 2 clean sheets) and won the Dynamo fans' vote for "player of the month" for August 2019.

On 30 August 2021, he signed a new four-year contract with Dynamo. After another Shunin injury in September 2021, he kept clean sheet in 3 consecutive games and was voted as player of the month once again.

On 15 March 2023, Leshchuk saved two penalty kicks in the shootout to eliminate Russian champions Zenit St. Petersburg from the Russian Cup.

Career statistics

References

External links
 
 Profile by Russian Professional Football League

1996 births
Footballers from Moscow
Living people
Russian footballers
Russia youth international footballers
Russia under-21 international footballers
Association football goalkeepers
FC Dynamo Moscow players
Russian Premier League players
Russian First League players
Russian Second League players